Apple Wallet, or simply Wallet and formerly known as Passbook, is a digital wallet developed by Apple Inc. and included with iOS and watchOS that allows users to store Wallet passes such as coupons, boarding passes, student ID cards, government ID cards, business credentials, resort passes, car keys, home keys, event tickets, public transportation passes, store cards, and – starting with iOS 8.1 – credit cards, debit cards, and prepaid cards for use via Apple Pay. Wallet was introduced as Passbook with iOS 6 on September 19, 2012. It was renamed Wallet with the release of iOS 9 in 2015. Wallet is also the main interface for Apple Card, Apple's credit card released in the U.S. on August 20, 2019.

History 
Apple Passbook was announced at the 2012 Apple Worldwide Developers Conference on June 11, 2012, and released with iOS 6 on September 19, 2012. It was renamed Wallet with the release of iOS 9 on September 16, 2015.

Features 
Wallet displays Aztec, PDF417, and QR 2D barcodes and Code 128 1D barcodes beginning with iOS 9. Each digital coupon or ticket is known as a "pass". When the user launches Wallet for the first time, a brief introduction screen appears with a button inviting users to browse apps on the App Store with Wallet integration. Passes can also be distributed online via Safari, sent to the user via email, or scanned using the built-in scanner in Wallet.

Passes are synced between iOS devices using iCloud, and OS X 10.8.2 and later also support opening passes to be sent to users' iOS devices. Although the app is available in iOS 6 or later, it is only available on iPhone and iPod Touch, but not on iPad.

Wallet has the following features:
Displays 2D barcodes of following types: Aztec, PDF417 and QR.
Displays 1D barcodes of following types: Code 128 beginning with iOS 9.
Triggered by location. Up to 10 locations can be added to each Pass. A location is programmed as GPS coordinates (longitude, latitude, and altitude) and/or iBeacon UUID. (The UUID is a Universally Unique Identifier which is a 32 ASCII character code or a code automatically generated from a name using the PassKit API.)
Triggered by time of pass.
Localisation of the pass. Up to 35 languages can be stored for each pass in Wallet.
Pass changes can be pushed via the Apple Push Notification Service by the pass provider, or manually updated by the user themselves.

Ecosystem 

Passes exist in a larger ecosystem, because  passes are created as a package. The package is a pass template, that is created with a pass signer, along with relevant data and a private key. Passes can be updated at any time using the PassKit API and an iOS app can interact directly with passes stored in Wallet.

Passes are presented and managed by Wallet. Systems and apps interact with passes via the PassKit API.

In its simplest form, an interaction (or transaction) between a pass and a system is facilitated by a 2D barcode or the modern QR code although it requires the customer to initiate the activity.

In late 2014, the first known implementations utilizing the iBeacon wireless geofencing started to appear in retail locations in the US. The iBeacon solutions allowed the retailer to broadcast an unsolicited lock-screen notice onto smartphones within Bluetooth range.

In 2015, Apple incorporated the ability to present a loyalty card in Wallet to a point-of-sale terminal via NFC. Walgreens enabled this first with their Balance Rewards loyalty program; customers can add their card to Wallet through the Walgreens or Duane Reade mobile apps and tap their phone to the terminal when prompted for their rewards card.

In 2016, Apple released the iPhone 7, along with Apple Pay support with Japan. This included IC e-cards like Suica to also be added digitally onto Apple Wallet. These cards work like a normal IC card, just on the iPhone, and Apple Wallet users can make normal transactions with their IC card using their iPhone, using the FeliCa NFC contactless technology to operate. Apple Wallet users can also reload their IC card just from their device using a debit or credit card added to Apple Wallet. To get a Suica, you could buy one digitally from Apple Wallet, or get a physical one from a JR East station and transfer the card balance to an iPhone. Japan's second main IC card, PASMO, would also be released later in 2020 with support with Apple Wallet. 

In 2018, support was added for contactless student IDs for select universities. Such credentials operate in a similar manner to physical RFID cards in that they can be tapped to supported readers. The power reserve feature on select iPhones and Apple Watches allows for continued use of the card even when the battery is depleted as long as Express Mode is enabled.

In 2020, car keys were made available for the Apple Wallet, beginning with supported BMW vehicles. Such keys can be shared with friends and family, and permissions can be set per member, such as how fast they can go and whether or not some vehicle-specific features can be enabled/disabled or not. Such passes can also operate over UWB in addition to NFC.

In 2021, Apple announced the ability to store government-issued ID cards, resort passes, home keys, and business credentials in Wallet. As of February 2023, three U.S. States offer the ability to store a state identification card within the wallet app, those being Maryland, Arizona, and Colorado.

In 2022, Apple announced a new feature to track your Apple Pay orders in Wallet.

Distribution 
Passes can be distributed anywhere a link can be embedded, such as via email, SMS, RCS, a webpage, an app, NFC tags, or QR codes.

Availability 
The Apple Wallet app is preinstalled on most iPhone and Apple Watch models worldwide, and developers from any country where Apple Developer resources are available can develop passes for Wallet. This is different from Apple Pay, which resides within Wallet, which currently has limited availability to a much smaller selection of nations.

Supported loyalty programs 
These programs are conveyed through NFC via Apple Wallet's VAS protocol. Programs that support One Tap are conveyed at the same time as a payment card stored in Apple Wallet. Conversely, Two Tap programs are redeemed in a sequential manner, where a loyalty pass is scanned first, and then the payment can be presented.

Supported government identifications 
These territories permit their residents to save their government-issued identification credentials in Apple Wallet. Unlike the equivalent physical credentials, mobile government IDs in Apple Wallet can only be presented using NFC, so no barcode is scanned when presenting. Mobile IDs in Apple Wallet operate over the ISO 18013 mobile personal identification standard. Once the credential is read, the ID holder must confirm the personal information they wish to share (full name, age, etc.) The transmission to the reader device will be completed over BLE after the presentation is fully verified. Added credentials can also be requested by apps to present virtually. Available for iPhone 8 or later, and Apple Watch Series 4 or later.

Supported home & car keys 
These home locks & car models can be unlocked via NFC with the iPhone XR, iPhone XS or later, and Apple Watch Series 5 or later. In addition, certain car models that support operation via UWB will require an UWB compatible device, such as the iPhone 11 or later or the Apple Watch Series 6 or later.

Supported campus identifications

References

External links 
Wallet apps in the iTunes Store

CS1 errors: missing title
iOS software
watchOS software
iOS-based software made by Apple Inc.
Online payments
Mobile payments